Plenasium vachellii is a fern in the family Osmundaceae. The genus Plenasium is recognized in the Pteridophyte Phylogeny Group classification of 2016 (PPG I); however, some sources place all Plenasium species in a more broadly defined Osmunda, treating this species as Osmunda vachellii. It is native to south-central and southeast China (including Hainan) and Indochina (the Malayan peninsula, Myanmar, Thailand and Vietnam).

References

Osmundales
Flora of South-Central China
Flora of Southeast China
Flora of Hainan
Flora of Indo-China